Rwanda made its Paralympic Games début at the 2000 Summer Paralympics in Sydney. It was represented by a single competitor, male swimmer Cesar Rwagasana. In 2004, Rwanda sent two runners: Olive Akobasenga and Jean de Dieu Nkundabera. Nkundabera won bronze in men's 800m race (T46 category). He was the country's sole representative in 2008, entering the same event, but this time failed to advance past the heats.

Rwanda has never participated in the Winter Paralympics.

Full results for Rwanda at the Paralympics

See also
 Rwanda at the Olympics

References